Bring It On may refer to:

Books
Bring It On (book), by Pat Robertson
Bring It On! (manhwa), a romance manhwa by Baek Hye-Kyung

Film and stage
 Bring It On (film series), a series of cheerleading films
 Bring It On (film), a 2000 American teen comedy film
 "Bring It On", an episode of the Canadian TV series 6teen
 Bring It On: The Musical, a musical with music by Tom Kitt and Lin-Manuel Miranda

Music
"Bring It On" (Alistair Griffin song), a 2004 single by Alistair Griffin
"Bring It On" (Godsmack song), from the 2006 album Madden NFL 06:Soundtrack
"Bring It On" (Hard-Fi song), from the 2011 album Killer Sounds
"Bring It On" (Lenny Kravitz song), from the 2007 album It Is Time for a Love Revolution
"Bring It On" (YoungBoy Never Broke Again song)
"Bring It On", a 1993 song on the Geto Boys album Till Death Do Us Part
"Bring It On", by Seal from the 1994 album Seal
"Bring It On", a 1996 song by Jay-Z from the album Reasonable Doubt
"Bring It On", a 1997 single by Lynyrd Skynyrd from the album Twenty
"Bring It On", a 1997 song by the Jungle Brothers from the album Raw Deluxe
"Bring It On", a 1998 single by N'Dea Davenport
"Bring It On", by Gomez from their 1999 album Liquid Skin
"Bring It On", a 2000 song by Billie Piper from the album Walk of Life
"Bring It On", by Nick Cave and the Bad Seeds from the 2003 album Nocturama
"Bring It On", a 2007 single by Goose
"Bring It On", by Daddy Yankee from the 2007 album El Cartel: The Big Boss
"Bring It On", a 2009 single by The Chipmunks from the album Alvin and the Chipmunks: The Squeakquel: Original Motion Picture Soundtrack
"Bring It On...Bring It On", a 1983 song by James Brown

Albums
Bring It On (Gomez album), 1998
Bring It On (Keith Harling album), 1999
Bring It On (Alistair Griffin album), 2004
Bring It On (Kevin Fowler album), 2007
Bring It On! (Machine Gun Fellatio album), 2000
Bring It On! (HorrorPops album), 2005
Bring It On (Kaci Battaglia album), 2010
Bring It On! (James Brown album), 1983
Bring It On, a 1997 album by Leadfoot
Bring It On, a 2006 album by Goose
Bring It On, a 2006 album by Jon Eberson
Bring It On: The Best of Jay-Z, a 2003 compilation album

See also 
Bring It (disambiguation)